Medak mandal is one of the 46 mandals in Medak district of the Indian state of Telangana. It is under the administration of Medak revenue division and the headquarters are located at Medak. The mandal is bounded by Ramayampet, Shankarapet (R), Kulcharam, Papannapet mandals and  a portion of it also borders Nizamabad district.

Government and politics 

Medak mandal is one of the four mandals under Medak assembly constituency, which in turn represents Medak lok sabha constituency of Telangana Legislative Assembly.

Towns and villages 

 census, the mandal has 43 settlements. It includes 2 towns and 41 villages.

The settlements in the mandal are listed below:

Note: M-Municipality

See also 
 List of mandals in Telangana

References 

Mandals in Medak district